Ochromolopis staintonellus is a moth of the family Epermeniidae. It is found in southern Europe.

The larvae feed on Osyris alba.

References

External links
lepiforum.de

Moths described in 1869
Epermeniidae
Moths of Europe